Bela Pana is a drink made from bael (Aegle marmelos) fruit pulp. It is used on the festive occasion of Pana Sankranti (Odia new year) during the month of Baisakha, in Odisha, India.

Ingredients
Ripe bael, milk, black pepper, chhena, ¼ cup banana peeled and cut into tiny pieces, ½ cup honey or Jaggery, ½ cup yogurt, 2 cardamom, a handful of cashews ground separately, fistful of fresh grated coconut.

Utility
It is an antidote for sunstroke and a must in Odia New Year. It is also used for stomach problems.

See also
Odia cuisine

References
Bela pana
Bela Pana (ବେଲ ପଣା)

Odia cuisine
Indian drinks